Disclosure in Red is the first studio album by the Norwegian gothic metal band, Trail of Tears.

Track listing
All music by Trail of Tears except "Illusion?" by Frank Ørland.
All lyrics by R. Thorsen and H. Michaelsen

 "When Silence Cries..." – 5:10
 "The Daughters of Innocence" – 3:54
 "The Day We Drowned" – 4:40
 "Mournful Pigeon" – 5:00
 "Swallowed Tears" – 4:40
 "Illusion?" – 3:26
 "Enigma of the Absolute" – 4:05
 "Words of the Fly" – 2:59
 "Temptress" – 5:19
 "The Burden – 8:05
 "Once a Paradise" (Japanese bonus) – 4:34
 "Orroro" (Japanese bonus) – 1:56

Personnel 
 Ronny Thorsen - vocals
 Helena Iren Michaelsen - vocals
 Runar Hansen - lead guitars
 Terje Heiseldal - guitars
 Kjell Rune Hagen - bass guitar
 Frank Roald Hagen - synths
 Jonathan Pérez - drums

References

Trail of Tears (band) albums
1998 debut albums